Udea montensis is a moth in the family Crambidae. It was described by Akira Mutuura in 1954. It is found in Honshu, Japan.

References

montensis
Moths described in 1954